Musab Fayez Al-Juwayr (born 20 June 2003), is a Saudi Arabian professional footballer who plays as a midfielder for Saudi Professional League side Al-Hilal.

Career
Al-Juwayr started his career at the youth teams of Al-Hilal. He was promoted to the first team during the 2021 summer training camp. He signed his first professional contract with the club on 8 August 2021. He made his debut on 13 September 2021 in the AFC Champions League match against Esteghlal. Al-Juwayr made his league debut and scored his first goal for the club on 4 November in the 2–0 win against Damac.

Career statistics

Club

International

Honours

Club
Al-Hilal
 Saudi Professional League: 2021–22
 AFC Champions League: 2021
 Saudi Super Cup: 2021

International
Saudi Arabia U20
 Arab Cup U-20: 2021, 2022

Saudi Arabia U23
WAFF U-23 Championship: 2022

References

External links
 

2003 births
Living people
Association football midfielders
Saudi Arabian footballers
Saudi Arabia youth international footballers
Saudi Arabia international footballers
Al Hilal SFC players
Saudi Professional League players